First-seeded Margaret Smith defeated Jan Lehane 6–2, 6–2 in the final to win the women's singles tennis title at the 1963 Australian Championships.

Seeds
The seeded players are listed below. Margaret Smith is the champion; others show the round in which they were eliminated.

 Margaret Smith (champion)
 Lesley Turner (semifinals)
 Jan Lehane (finalist)
 Christine Truman (second round)
 Robyn Ebbern (quarterfinals)
 Elizabeth Starkie (quarterfinals)
 Rita Bentley (quarterfinals)
 Madonna Schacht (quarterfinals)

Draw

Key
 Q = Qualifier
 WC = Wild card
 LL = Lucky loser
 r = Retired

Finals

Earlier rounds

Section 1

Section 2

Section 3

Section 4

External links
 archived results of the Australian Open homepage

1963 in women's tennis
1963
1963 in Australian tennis
1963 in Australian women's sport